HMS Surly was a  of the Royal Navy.  She was launched at Clydebank in 1894, served in home waters and was sold in 1920.

Design and construction
On 3 November 1893 the British Admiralty placed an order with the Glasgow shipbuilder J&G Thomson as part of the 1893–1894 Naval Estimates for three torpedo-boat destroyers,  and Surly, with Surly expected to be delivered within 16 months. The Admiralty laid down broad requirements for the destroyers, including speed, the use of an arched turtleback forecastle and armament, with the detailed design left to the builders, resulting in each of the builders producing different designs.

Displacement was  light and  full load. Three funnels were fitted. Armament consisted of a single QF 12 pounder 12 cwt gun on a platform on the ship's conning tower (in practice the platform was also used as the ship's bridge) and three 6-pounder guns, with two 18 inch (450 mm) torpedo tubes. One of the torpedo tubes could be removed to accommodate a further two six-pounders, although by 1908 both five 6-pounder guns and both torpedo tubes were generally fitted.

Surly was laid down at Thomson's Clydeside shipyard as yard number 271 on 14 February 1894 and was launched on 10 November 1894. She reached a speed of  during sea trials and was commissioned in July 1895.

Service
Surly spent her whole career in British waters, and was based at Portsmouth. She took part in the 1901 British Naval Manoeuvres. Surly was used in trials in the use of oil fuel instead of coal from 1898, which were still ongoing in 1906.

On 30 August 1912 the Admiralty directed all destroyers were to be grouped into classes designated by letters based on contract speed and appearance.

In March 1913, Surly was in commission with a nucleus crew at Portsmouth, as a tender for HMS Fisgard, the Royal Navy's training school for engineers. Surly remained at Portsmouth as a tender to Fisgard in July 1914, on the eve of the outbreak of the First World War.

The Royal Navy mobilised its reserve forces on the eve of the outbreak of the First World War in August 1914, and in January 1915, although still a tender to Fisgard, Surly was also a member of the Portsmouth Local Defence Flotilla.

Notes

Citations

Bibliography
 
 

 
 

 
 

Rocket-class destroyers
Ships built on the River Clyde
1894 ships
A-class destroyers (1913)
World War I destroyers of the United Kingdom